Transportes Aéreos Nacionales SA, also known as TAN Airlines, was a Honduran airline, headquartered at the Edificio TAN in Tegucigalpa.

History

The airline was formed in 1947 by private investors to operate cargo flights by contract. In 1950, the company started scheduled passenger and cargo services.

The airline acquired a Douglas DC-6A freighter aircraft in March 1973 and operated it until its sale in September 1979, using it particularly on their route to Miami.

In , TAN acquired Pan Am's 38% holding in SAHSA. According to the Official Airline Guide (OAG), TAN was operating a Convair 880 jet in 1972 on flights to Miami. According to the OAG, in 1980 TAN was serving Miami nonstop from Belize City and San Pedro Sula as well as operating direct flights to Miami from La Ceiba and Tegucigalpa primarily with the Boeing 737-200 with some passenger flights being operated with the Lockheed L-188 Electra.

In , the company experienced its worst accident when a Boeing 727-200 crashed on approach to Toncontín Airport, killing 131 occupants on board.

On 1 November 1991, TAN Airlines merged with SAHSA, adopting the latter name.

Destinations
Transportes Aéreos Nacionales served the following destinations all through its history:

Belize
Belize CityPhilip S. W. Goldson International Airport
Honduras
La CeibaGolosón International Airport
San Pedro SulaRamón Villeda Morales International Airport
TegucigalpaToncontín International Airport
Mexico
Mexico D.F.Mexico City International Airport
United States
MiamiMiami International Airport

Accidents and incidents
, Aviation Safety Network recorded six accidents or incidents for Transportes Aéreos Nacionales, totalling at least 138 fatalities. , the accident remains the deadliest one to occur on Honduran soil. Following is a list of accidents/incidents experienced by the carrier; the list includes events in which there were fatalities, the aircraft involved resulted damaged beyond repair, or both.

See also

Transport in Honduras

Bibliography
 Roach, J and Eastwood, A.B., Piston Engined Airliner Production List, The Aviation Hobby Shop, West Drayton, Middlesex, 2007, ISBN None.

References

Defunct airlines of Honduras
SAHSA
Airlines established in 1947
Airlines disestablished in 1991